The Wrestling Competition at the 2001 Mediterranean Games was held in Tunis, Tunisia from June 26 to July 1, 2001.

Medal table

Medalists

Men's freestyle

Men's Greco-Roman

Women's freestyle

References
 Complete 2001 Mediterranean Games Standings

Mediterranean Games
Wrestling
2001
Wrestling in Tunisia